Anagennisi Prosfigon Ayiou Antoniou Lemesou is a Cypriot association football club based in Ayios Antonios, Limassol. It has 5 participations in Cypriot Fourth Division. The team was founded by refugees who moved to Limassol after the Turkish invasion of Cyprus of 1974.

References
 

Football clubs in Cyprus
Association football clubs established in 1975
1975 establishments in Cyprus